A regional election took place in Nord-Pas-de-Calais on 21 and 28 March 2004, along with all other regions. Daniel Percheron (PS) was re-elected President of the Council.

Results

References

Nord-Pas-de-Calais
Nord-Pas-de-Calais, 2004